J. Oor was a piano factory based in Brussels.

History 

Jean-Baptiste Oor (2 February 1846 in Brussels - 10 November 1940 in Brussels) was a Belgian piano maker, who set up a company in 30 Rue d'Arenberg in Brussels in 1871. This production lasted until 1935. He received praise and many prices at international exhibitions.

His son Lucien Oor (2 January 1877 in Brussels - 1949 in Brussels) founded his own factory in 1907 at a much higher quality level. He had undergone an apprenticeship training at Steinway & Sons in New York City. His  manufacturing workshops were located at 23 Rue Glibert in Laeken and produced very good instruments. Foreign competition, coupled with an expensive management and the crisis of 1929, led to the closure of the company.

References 

Manufacturing companies based in Brussels
Piano manufacturing companies
Musical instrument manufacturing companies of Belgium
Music in Brussels